The 2013 FIBA Americas Championship for Women was the qualifying tournament for FIBA Americas at the 2014 FIBA World Championship for Women in Turkey. The tournament was held at the Gimnasio USBI in Xalapa, Mexico from 21 to 28 September 2013.

Cuba won their fourth title after defeating Canada 77–71 in the final.

Qualification

Qualification was done via FIBA Americas' sub-zones. USA Basketball chose not to enter its national team, because it had already qualified for the 2014 World Championships by winning the 2012 Olympics. The qualified teams were:
South American Sub-Zone (FIBA South American Championship for Women 2013):

North America Sub-Zone:
 (qualified automatically)
Central American and Caribbean Zone (2012 Centrobasket Women):

 (host)

Draw
The draw was held in San Juan, Puerto Rico on July 12, 2013.

Format
The top two teams from each group advanced to the semifinals.
The winners in the knockout semifinals advanced to the Final. The losers played for the third place.

Tie-breaking criteria
Ties are broken via the following the criteria, with the first option used first, all the way down to the last option:
Head to head results
Goal average (not the goal difference) between the tied teams
Goal average of the tied teams for all teams in its group

Squads

Preliminary round

All times local (UTC−5)

Group A

|}

Group B

|}

Final round

Semifinals

Third place game

Final

Final ranking

References

External links
Official website

FIBA Women's AmeriCup
2013 in women's basketball
2013 in Mexican sports
International women's basketball competitions hosted by Canada
2013–14 in North American basketball
2013–14 in South American basketball